Will Starr (27 April 1922 – 6 March 1976) was a Scottish solo accordionist.

Early life
Will Starr was born William Starrs, the oldest son of a family of eight, in the mining village of Croy in Central Scotland.

At the age of two, Will attempted to play his first tune, "Poor Old Joe", on a melodeon belonging to his father, Joseph Starrs. His family recognised the musical potential in young William and encouraged him to continue playing the melodeon. Later he progressed from the melodeon to the chromatic button accordion which he played for the remainder of his life.

Will frequently played at local events and social functions accompanied by his sister Rosie, a singer.

Teenage Years
At the age of thirteen, while making a solo guest appearance at a County Dinner in the Grand Hotel in Glasgow, Will was introduced by Sir Ian Colquhoun to Jock Kilpatrick, the manager of the Pavilion Theatre in Glasgow. Jock invited him to join the cast as a solo performer, and after being granted permission to take time off school, Will began his initially part-time professional stage career.

On leaving school at fourteen, Will began working in the mines. When at the age of eighteen in World War II he became eligible for service in the armed forces, he was exempted as an already working miner.

Will recorded his first 78 record for Parlophone at the age of 18. The music was of his own composition and was named "Jacqueline" (which is almost always referred to erroneously as "The Jacqueline Waltz") after his then girlfriend.

Adult Years
Although Will Starr travelled the world as an international performer, he always returned to Croy during his breaks from performing.

Will Starr died from cancer of the spine in his home town of Croy on 6 March 1976 and was buried in the Starr family grave in Howe Road Cemetery, Kilsyth, Stirlingshire.

External links
Music in Scotland - Will Starr
Tribute to Will Starr

1922 births
1976 deaths
Scottish accordionists
20th-century Scottish male musicians
20th-century accordionists
Deaths from cancer in Scotland
Neurological disease deaths in Scotland
Deaths from spinal cancer
People from Croy